The 1964–65 Scottish League Cup was the 19th season of Scotland's second football knockout competition. The competition was won for the successive second season by Rangers, who defeated Celtic in the Final.

First round

Group 1

Group 2

Group 3

Group 4

Group 5

Group 6

Group 7

Group 8

Group 9

Supplementary Round

First Leg

Second Leg

Quarter-finals

First Leg

Second Leg

Semi-finals

Ties

Final

References

General

Specific 

League Cup
Scottish League Cup seasons